Lidé na kře is a 1937 Czech drama film directed by Martin Frič. The film was nominated for Best Foreign Film at the 5th Venice International Film Festival. František Smolík won the Award for the Best Czechoslovak actor in 1937.

Cast
 František Smolík as Professor Václav Junek
 Zdeňka Baldová as Anna Junková, Professor's wife
 Ladislav Boháč as Zdeněk Junek
 Lída Baarová as Dr. Pavla Junková
 Hana Vítová as Hanka Junková
 Ladislav Pešek as Jirka Junek
 Růžena Šlemrová as Aunt Máli
 Ella Nollová as Maid Barča
 Bedřich Veverka as Dr. Vladimír Řípa
 Jiří Dohnal as Soccer player Franta Cikán
 Ladislav Hemmer as Film director Frank Pavelka
 Marie Glázrová as Marta, Zdeněk's girlfriend
 Jaroslav Marvan as Minister Bedřich Peterka
 Zvonimir Rogoz as Film businessman Bruckman

References

External links
 

1937 films
1937 drama films
1930s Czech-language films
Czechoslovak black-and-white films
Czechoslovak drama films
Films directed by Martin Frič
1930s Czech films